W18DZ-D (channel 68) is a television station serving eastern Puerto Rico that is licensed to Ceiba. The station is owned by TV Red Puerto Rico. The station's transmitter is located at highway PR-982 between Fajardo and Ceiba.

References

External links

18DZ-D
Low-power television stations in the United States